Justice Carr may refer to:

 Dabney Carr, associate justice of the Virginia Supreme Court from 1824 to 1837
 Leland W. Carr, associate justice of the Michigan Supreme Court from 1945 to 1963